Pulford Castle is in the village of Pulford, Cheshire, England, immediately south of St Mary's Church. It is listed as a Scheduled Ancient Monument.

History

The castle is a small motte and bailey guarding the crossing of Pulford Brook, which forms the border between England and Wales, and adjacent to the Wrexham–Chester road.  It was founded in the 12th century by Robert de Pulford. Only the earthworks remain. In 1313, a jury of the Chester county court found that the lord of Little Caldy (Wirral) held that manor by the service of 'palisading' (i.e. repairing the wooden defences) of Robert de Pulford's castle at Pulford.

See also

List of Scheduled Monuments in Cheshire (1066–1539)
List of castles in Cheshire

References

Further reading

Castles in Cheshire
Scheduled monuments in Cheshire
Cheshire West and Chester